Bradley Alexander Branson  (born September 24, 1958) is an American retired professional basketball player who played in the National Basketball Association (NBA) and other leagues. He was a 6'10" and  forward. Branson played college basketball for the SMU Mustangs.

Professional career
After being selected by the Detroit Pistons in the 1980 NBA Draft, Branson played in two NBA seasons for the Cleveland Cavaliers (1981–82) and the Indiana Pacers (1982–83).

Notes

External links
Liga ACB profile Retrieved 9 July 2015 

1958 births
Living people
American expatriate basketball people in Italy
American expatriate basketball people in Spain
American men's basketball players
Anchorage Northern Knights players
Basket Brescia Leonessa players
Basket Rimini Crabs players
Basketball players from Illinois
Cleveland Cavaliers players
Detroit Pistons draft picks
Indiana Pacers players
Junior college men's basketball players in the United States
Lega Basket Serie A players
Liga ACB players
People from Harvey, Illinois
Power forwards (basketball)
Real Madrid Baloncesto players
SMU Mustangs men's basketball players
Sportspeople from Cook County, Illinois
Valencia Basket players